Zelenodolsk is a city in Kryvyi Rih Raion of Dnipropetrovsk Oblast (province) of Ukraine. It hosts the administration of Zelenodolsk urban hromada, one of the hromadas of Ukraine. Population: .

Until 18 July 2020, Zelenodolsk belonged to Apostolove Raion. The raion was abolished in July 2020 as part of the administrative reform of Ukraine, which reduced the number of raions of Dnipropetrovsk Oblast to seven. The area of Apostolove Raion was merged into Kryvyi Rih Raion.  

Zelenodolsk is claimed by Russia as part of their claimed Kherson Oblast, though it is not controlled by them.

References

Sources
 

Cities in Dnipropetrovsk Oblast
Cities of district significance in Ukraine
Populated places established in the Ukrainian Soviet Socialist Republic